Alex Mammone is an Australian professional rugby league footballer who played for Halifax in the Kingstone Press Championship. He plays as a prop.

Mammone has previously played for the London Broncos.

Mammone broke his cheekbone in March 2017 playing for Halifax in the Challenge Cup against the Hunslet Hawks.

He returned towards the end of the regular season and featured in the Qualifiers for Halifax.

References

External links
Halifax profile

Living people
Australian expatriate sportspeople in England
Rugby league props
Halifax R.L.F.C. players
London Broncos players
Place of birth missing (living people)
Year of birth missing (living people)